Albertino Essers (born 30 May 1969) is a Dutch former professional darts player. Nicknamed The Sensation, he competed in British Darts Organisation (BDO) events.

Career

In the 2007 BDO World Darts Championship, Essers defeated the number 2 seed, Scotland's Gary Anderson, in the first round, but lost to Scotsman Paul Hanvidge in the second round. Paul Hogan beat Essers in the second round in 2006, after Essers had defeated Ted Hankey 3–1 in the first round. At one point Essers suffered from dartitis, an inability to release the dart while throwing.

World Championship performances

BDO

 2003: 1st Round (lost to Richie Davies 1–3)
 2004: 1st Round (lost to Steve Duke 1–3)
 2006: 2nd Round (lost to Paul Hogan 2–4)
 2007: 2nd Round (lost to Paul Hanvidge 1–4)

Performance timeline

Notes

External links
Profile and stats on Darts Database

1969 births
Living people
People from Renkum
Sportspeople from Gelderland
Dutch darts players
British Darts Organisation players
20th-century Dutch people
21st-century Dutch people